The World Jones Made is a 1956 science fiction novel by American writer Philip K. Dick, examining notions of precognition, humanity, and politics. It was first published by Ace Books as one half of Ace Double D-150, bound dos-à-dos with Agent of the Unknown by Margaret St. Clair.

Plot summary

The World Jones Made is set in the year 2002 AD. On a then-future post-apocalyptic Earth, there was a devastating conflict that involved the use of atomic weapons. Many American cities were targeted, and the People's Republic of China (and Soviet Union) also collapsed, leading to the imposition of a Federal World Government (Fedgov).

In this particular dystopia, Relativism (a social and philosophical theory having originated with Albert Einstein's theory of General Relativity in Physics) emerged as the governing political orthodoxy.  Relativism is said to be an ethical philosophy that states everyone is free to believe what they wish, as long as they don't make anyone else try to follow that principle. Relativism has become established law after the destructiveness of the war unleashed by clashing ideologies. (However, dissidents from that orthodoxy do end up in forced labor camps.) This sacrosanct principle is challenged by a man named Floyd Jones, whose assertions about the future prove correct.

Relativism enables legal consumption of drugs like heroin and marijuana, as well as watching live sex shows with hermaphrodite human mutants. Due to the mutagenic effects of radiation from wartime nuclear exchanges, mutants earn their living within the entertainment industry, although one group has been subjected to deliberate genetic engineering, which later enables them to settle (an inhabitable) Venus.

Doug Cussick is an agent of Fedgov, and his involvement with Jones encompasses this book. Jones has precognitive abilities that let him see a year into the future, which allows Dick to explore questions of predestination, free will and determinism.

Fedgov encounters apparently unintelligent alien lifeforms named Drifters, which turn out to be one gamete of a spore-based migratory alien life form. Their apparently pointless destruction leads to a retaliatory alien quarantine of the human race to a few nearby star systems. The presence of the Drifters in the story is to give Jones an initial rallying-point for all of his xenophobic followers. The collapse of Fedgov and rise of Jones to become world dictator have some similarities to the historical fall of the Weimar Republic and rise of Hitler to power in Germany. Jones' ability to see the future a year in advance makes him a charismatic leader, whose followers see him as infallible - forgetting that seeing a year in advance leaves him just as blind as anyone to what might happen later than a year in the future.

In the event, the plot demonstrates, in the context of ensuing events, that Jones is far more susceptible to error than he was previously willing to admit. His whole approach has been one of an all-or-nothing gamble on the infallibility of his precognitive powers.

Jones foresees his own assassination one year before it actually happens. Not only does he not attempt to avoid his execution, but he actually facilitates it by leaping into the path of a bullet meant for a bodyguard. This does not occur, however, before he and his followers create a cult that overthrows Fedgov, leading to the resettlement of Doug, his wife Nina and their three-year-old son in an artificial habitat on Venus.

The novel addresses questions of Jones's agenda and trustworthiness as well as the decidedly ambiguous benefits of individual precognition.

Adaptations
In August 2009, Terry Gilliam confirmed that he was planning to direct a film adaptation of the novel. There has been no news of the project since then.

References

External links
 
The World Jones Made cover art gallery

1956 American novels
1956 science fiction novels
Ace Books books
American philosophical novels
American science fiction novels
Novels by Philip K. Dick
Post-apocalyptic novels
Fiction set in 2002